The following is a complete list of Home media releases for the CBS television series NCIS. The first nine seasons have been released on DVD in Regions 1, 2 and 4. In Germany (Region 2), season 1–4 and 6–8 were released in two separate sets for each season. The first season DVD release omits the introductory episodes that aired as part of the eighth season of JAG. The JAG Season 8 DVD set was released in Region 1 on March 17, 2009, in Region 2 on June 21, 2010, and Region 4 on August 5, 2010. All releases are distributed by Paramount Home Entertainment through CBS Home Entertainment.

Full Seasons

Compilations

References

External links
 

Home video releases
NCIS